Empresa Brasileira de Infraestrutura Aeroportuária (abr. Infraero) is a Brazilian government corporation founded in 1973, authorized by Law 5,862, being responsible for operating the main Brazilian commercial airports. In 2011 Infraero's airports carried 179,482,228 passengers, 1,464,484 tons of cargo, and operated 2,893,631 take-offs and landings. Presently it manages 45 airports.

The company is present all over Brazil and employs approximately 23,000 employees and subcontracted workers nationwide. It is headquartered in the Infraero Building, in Brasília, Federal District.

Investments
The company implements a workplan which covers practically all airports managed by it and which generates over 50 thousand jobs all over Brazil. The Brazilian airport infrastructure, which may match to the international standards, is being updated to meet the next years demand.

The works are performed with the company's own revenue, mainly generated by the air cargo storage and custom duty, granting of commercial areas in the airports, boarding, landing and stay tariffs, and rendering of communication and air navigation auxiliary services.

On 9 October 2009, it was announced that Infraero will invest in airports abroad: Infraero was invited by the Government of Paraguay to administer Silvio Pettirossi International Airport in Asunción and invited to participate in the privatization of Ruzyně Airport in Prague, Czech Republic, among other investments.

On March 4, 2010, the government of Brazil announced that it would adopt the model of concession to airports. For this reason Infraero would become a concessionary rather than an administrator of the airports that it currently operates. The main consequence is the fact that Infraero will be able to open its capital and obtain resources necessary for infra-structure investments. Another consequence is that municipal or state governments would have it easier to change concessionaries, such as the intention announced on 28 August 2009 by Rosinha Matheus, the Mayor of Campos dos Goytacazes, who requested Infraero the transfer of the administration of Bartolomeu Lysandro Airport to the Municipality. The Minister of Defense, to whom Infraero was subordinate (currently it belongs to Civil Aviation Secretary), announced being in favor of the transfer.

Concessions
On April 26, 2011, it was confirmed that in order to speed-up much needed renovation and up-grade works, private companies would be granted a concession to commercially exploit some Infraero airports in exchange for the implementation of those works. Listed airports included São Paulo/Guarulhos – Governador André Franco Montoro International Airport, Brasília – Presidente Juscelino Kubitschek International Airport, Campinas – Viracopos International Airport, and later Belo Horizonte – Tancredo Neves International Airport and Rio de Janeiro – Galeão/Antonio Carlos Jobim International Airport. The plan was confirmed on May 31, 2011, and it was added that Infraero would retain 49% of the shares of each privatized airport.

The concession program was divided into phases, each with its own public bidding.

The first phase was related to Gov. Aluízio Alves International Airport in Natal. On August 22, 2011, its concession was won by the Consortium Inframérica, formed by the Brazilian Engineering Group Engevix (50%) and the Argentinean Group Corporación América (50%), which operates 52 airports in seven countries. After the signature of the contract of concession, Inframérica Consortium was authorized to commercially explore the facility for 25 years (with one possible five-year extension). As part of the concession agreement Infraero holds no shares participation in this facility.

The second phase was related to an auction that took place on February 6, 2012. 
 In it Consortium Inframérica won the concession of Brasília – Presidente Juscelino Kubitschek International Airport, which will be explored for a period of 25 years. 
 On the same auction, Consortium Invepar-ACSA composed by the Brazilian Investments and Funds Society Invepar (90%) and the South African airport operator ACSA (10%) won the concession for São Paulo/Guarulhos – Governador André Franco Montoro International Airport and was authorized to explore the facility for 20 years. 
 Lastly, on the same day, Consortium Aeroportos Brasil composed by the Brazilian Investments and Funds Society Triunfo (45%), the Engineering and Investments Society Participações (45%), and the French airport operator Egis Avia (10%) won the concession for Campinas – Viracopos International Airport, to be explored for 30 years.

The third phase took place on November 22, 2013, when the Brazilian Government had a bidding process for:
 the operation of Rio de Janeiro–Galeão International Airport from 2014 until 2039 was won by the Group Aeroporto Rio de Janeiro formed by the Brazilian Conglomerate Odebrecht (60%) and Changi Airport Group (40%) paid BRL 19 billion and won the concession. The contract was signed on April 2, 2014. 
 for the operation of Belo Horizonte-Tancredo Neves International Airport with rights from 2014 until 2044. The group BH Airport formed by the Brazilian investment company CCR (75%) and the remaining (25%) shared by Flughafen München GmbH the administrator of Munich Airport and Flughafen Zürich AG the administrator of Zurich Airport among others won the bidding.

Starting on the fourth phase, Infraero ceased to have a mandatory 49% of the shares of each privatized airport.

The fourth phase took place on March 16, 2017, and the result was:
 Deputado Luís Eduardo Magalhães International Airport in Salvador da Bahia was won by the French airport operator Vinci SA valid for 30 years;
 Salgado Filho International Airport in Porto Alegre and Pinto Martins International Airport in Fortaleza were won by the German airport operator Fraport. Porto Alegre is valid for 25 years and Fortaleza for 30 years;
 Hercílio Luz International Airport in Florianópolis was won by the Swiss airport operator Flughafen Zürich AG valid for 30 years.

The fifth phase, done in blocks valid for 30 years, took place on March 15, 2019, and the result was: 
 Guararapes–Gilberto Freyre International Airport in Recife, Zumbi dos Palmares International Airport in Maceió, Presidente Castro Pinto International Airport in João Pessoa, Santa Maria Airport in Aracaju, Campina Grande Airport, and Juazeiro do Norte Airport were won by the Spanish airport operator AENA; 
 Eurico de Aguiar Salles Airport in Vitória and Macaé Airport were won by the Swiss airport operator Flughafen Zürich AG;
 Marechal Rondon International Airport in Cuiabá; Sinop Airport; Rondonópolis Airport, and Alta Floresta Airport, were won by the Brazilian consortium Aeroeste, formed by companies Socicam and Sinart.

The sixth phase, done in blocks valid for 30 years, took place on April 7, 2021, and the result was:
 Afonso Pena International Airport, Bacacheri Airport, Foz do Iguaçu International Airport, Londrina Airport, Navegantes Airport, Joinville-Lauro Carneiro de Loyola Airport, Pelotas International Airport, Ruben Berta International Airport, and Comte. Gustavo Kraemer International Airport were won by the Brazilian investment company CCR;
 Santa Genoveva Airport, Palmas Airport, Teresina Airport, Petrolina Airport, Mal. Cunha Machado International Airport, and Imperatriz Airport were won by the Brazilian investment company CCR;
 Brig. Eduardo Gomes International Airport, Tabatinga International Airport, Tefé Airport, Rio Branco International Airport, Cruzeiro do Sul International Airport, Gov. Jorge Teixeira de Oliveira International Airport, and Boa Vista International Airport were won by the French airport operator Vinci SA.

The seventh phase, done in blocks valid for 30 years, took place on August 18, 2022, and the result was:
 Campo de Marte Airport and Jacarepaguá Airport were won by the Brazilian investment company XP Inc.;
 Belém/Val-de-Cans International Airport and Macapá International Airport were won by the Brazilian consortium Novo Norte, formed by the companies Socicam and Sinart;
 São Paulo–Congonhas Airport, Campo Grande International Airport, Corumbá International Airport, Ponta Porã International Airport, Santarém-Maestro Wilson Fonseca Airport, Marabá Airport, Carajás Airport, Altamira Airport, Uberlândia Airport, Uberaba Airport, Montes Claros Airport were won by the Spanish operator AENA.

Further developments
On July 17, 2020, the Federal Government authorized the beginning of a new concession process for  Viracopos International Airport in Campinas upon request from the present concessionary Consortium Aeroportos Brasil.
    
On March 10, 2021, it was announced that the National Civil Aviation Agency of Brazil approved a new concession process for Gov. Aluízio Alves International Airport in Natal, as per request from the concessionary Consortium Inframérica made on March 5, 2020. It is expected that a new bidding will take place in 2021.

In February 2022, it was announced that the National Civil Aviation Agency of Brazil would start a new concession process for Rio de Janeiro – Galeão/Antonio Carlos Jobim International Airport, at the request of the concessionary. The facility would be re-auctioned together with Santos Dumont Airport.

Independent cases
On October 11, 2013, the administration of Bartolomeu Lysandro Airport in Campos dos Goytacazes was transferred from Infraero to the municipality of Campos dos Goytacazes.

On June 17, 2020, the Federal Government signed and agreement to transfer the administration of Pampulha – Carlos Drummond de Andrade Airport in Belo Horizonte from Infraero to the Government of the State of Minas Gerais.

On November 17, 2020, the concession of Paulo Afonso Airport in Paulo Afonso was transferred from Infraero to the Government of the State of Bahia.

On December 2, 2020, the Federal Government signed and agreement to transfer the administration of Prof. Urbano Ernesto Stumpf Airport in São José dos Campos to the Municipality of São José dos Campos.

Saturation levels
Responding to critiques to the situation of its airports, on May 18, 2011, Infraero released a list evaluating some of its most important airports according to its saturation levels. According to the list:

Airports critically saturated, operating above 85% of their capacity
Brasília – Presidente Juscelino Kubitschek International Airport
Cuiabá/Várzea Grande – Mal. Rondon International Airport
São Paulo/Guarulhos – Governador André Franco Montoro International Airport
Airports requiring attention, operating between 70% and 85% of their capacity
Belo Horizonte – Tancredo Neves International Airport
Campinas – Viracopos International Airport
Curitiba – Afonso Pena International Airport
Fortaleza – Pinto Martins International Airport
Airports with good situation, operating with less than 70% of their capacity
Manaus – Eduardo Gomes International Airport
Porto Alegre – Salgado Filho International Airport
Recife – Guararapes/Gilberto Freyre International Airport
Rio de Janeiro – Galeão/Antonio Carlos Jobim International Airport
Salvador – Deputado Luís Eduardo Magalhães International Airport

Investments related to the 2014 FIFA World Cup
On 31 August 2009 Infraero unveiled an ambitious BRL5.3 billion (US$2.8 billion; EUR2.0 billion) investment plan to upgrade airports of ten cities focusing mainly the preparations for the 2014 FIFA World Cup which was held in Brazil, and for the 2016 Summer Olympics, which was held in Rio de Janeiro. Of the twelve cities that held venues, ten received major investments. Natal – Augusto Severo International Airport and Salvador – Dep. Luís Eduardo Magalhães International Airport were excluded because their upgrade works were completed.

The investments were distributed as follows (in BRL million):

Ongoing works
Belo Horizonte
 Pampulha/Carlos Drummond de Andrade Airport
 New control tower. Value 5.6. Completion: originally November 2010; postponed to the end of 2012
 Upgrade of general aviation hangars. Value 1.2. Completion: July 2013.
 Enlargement of the apron. Value 1.6. Completion: July 2013.
 Tancredo Neves International Airport (Confins)
 Extension of runway, enlargement of apron and cargo terminal, construction of further taxiways. Value 120.0. Completion: July 2013.
 Renovation of the passenger terminal. Value 215.5. Completion: March 2014.
Brasília  – Presidente Juscelino Kubitschek International Airport
 Enlargement of apron and taxiways. Value 34.5. Completion: April 2011.
 Renovation of the existing passenger terminal. Value 22.5. Completion: November 2011.
 Enlargement of the passenger terminal. Value 439.0. Completion: April 2013.
 Parking. Value 18.8. Completion: April 2014
Campinas/São Paulo – Viracopos International Airport
 Construction of the second runway. Value 314.0. Completion: April 2013.
 Construction of phase 1 of a new passenger terminal. Value 2,500.0. Completion: May 2015.
Cuiabá – Marechal Rondon International Airport
 Renovation of passenger terminal, parking and access to the airport. Value 30.9. Completion: October 2012.
Curitiba  – Afonso Pena International Airport
 Enlargement of the apron and implementation of taxiways. Value 30.0. Completion: March 2011.
Fortaleza  – Pinto Martins International Airport
 Renovation and enlargement of passenger terminal, apron, and parking. Value 525.0. Completion: November 2013.
Manaus  – Eduardo Gomes International Airport
 Enlargement of apron and existing runway. Construction of second runway. Value 600.0. Completion: July 2013.
 Enlargement and renovation of the passenger terminal. Value 193.5. Completion: December 2013.
Porto Alegre  – Salgado Filho International Airport
 Extension of the runway. Value 122.0. Never completed.
Rio de Janeiro
 Galeão/Antonio Carlos Jobim International Airport
 Renovation of passenger terminal 1. Value 314.9. Completion: February 2011.
 Completion and renovation of passenger terminal 2. Value 284.0. Completion: May 2012.
 Construction of further parking. Value 220.0. Completion: May 2013.
 Santos Dumont Airport
 Completion of the renovation of the passenger arrivals terminal. Value 152.2. Completion: November 2011.
São Paulo
Congonhas Airport
 Renovation of the apron. Value 20.6. Completion: January 2012.
 Conclusion of the renovation on the south portion of the passenger terminal. Value 67.1. Completion: October 2012.
 Renovation of the north portion of the passenger terminal. Value 65.1. Completion: October 2014.
 Guarulhos/Governador André Franco Montoro International Airport
 Construction of further taxiways. Value 19.0. Completion: April 2011 (work not yet completed in August 2011).
 Enlargement of apron and taxiways. Value 370.5. Completion: July 2011 (work not yet completed in August 2011).
 Construction of the passenger terminal 3. Value 1,100.0. Completion: March 2014.

Completed works
Belo Horizonte – Tancredo Neves International Airport (Confins)
 Enlargement of Parking. Value 6.8. Completed on July 26, 2010
Recife – Guararapes/Gilberto Freyre International Airport
 Conclusion of the passenger terminal renovation with installation of further 8 jetways. Value: 8.75. Completed on July 1, 2011
São Paulo – Congonhas Airport
 New control tower. Value 11.9. Completed on May 8, 2013

List of airports managed by Infraero

As sole concessionary
The following airports are managed by Infraero in 2022:

Altamira – Altamira Airport
Belém – Val de Cans-Júlio Cezar Ribeiro International Airport
Belo Horizonte – Carlos Prates Airport
Campo Grande – Campo Grande International Airport
Carajás (Parauapebas) – Carajás Airport
Corumbá – Corumbá International Airport
Macapá – Alberto Alcolumbre International Airport
Marabá – Marabá Airport
Montes Claros – Mário Ribeiro Airport
Paulo Afonso – Paulo Afonso Airport
Ponta Porã – Ponta Porã International Airport
Rio de Janeiro
Jacarepaguá Airport
Santos Dumont Airport
Santarém – Maestro Wilson Fonseca Airport
São Paulo
Campo de Marte Airport
Congonhas Airport
Uberaba – Mário de Almeida Franco Airport
Uberlândia – Ten. Cel. Av. César Bombonato Airport

 
a. The airport will cease all operations permanently on December 31, 2022.
b. On November 17, 2020, the concession was transferred to the State of Bahia. The State and Infraero will jointly administrate the facilities until December 31, 2021. 
c. On August 18, 2022, the concession was transferred to XP Inc.. XP and Infraero will jointly administrate the facilities until December 31, 2022.
d. On August 18, 2022, the concession was transferred to Consortium Novo Norte. Novo Norte and Infraero will jointly administrate the facilities until December 31, 2022.
e. On August 18, 2022, the concession was transferred to AENA. AENA and Infraero will jointly administrate the facilities until December 31, 2022.

As partner concessionary
The following airports are administrated by concessionaries in which Infraero has minoritary participation in shares:
Belo Horizonte – Tancredo Neves International Airport (Concession to AeroBrasil) 
Brasília – Pres. Juscelino Kubitschek International Airport (Concession to Inframérica)
Campinas – Viracopos International Airport (Concession to Aeroportos Brasil)
Rio de Janeiro – Galeão/Antonio Carlos Jobim International Airport (Concession to Aeroporto Rio de Janeiro)
São Paulo – Guarulhos/Gov. André Franco Montoro International Airport (Cumbica) (Concession to Invepar-ACSA)

By contract
The following airports are managed by Infraero by contract:
Divinópolis – Brigadeiro Cabral Airport
Guarujá / Santos – Guarujá Civil Metropolitan Aerodrome
Ipatinga – Vale do Aço Regional Airport 
Juiz de Fora – Francisco Álvares de Assis Airport 
Mossoró – Dix-Sept Rosado Airport  
Passo Fundo – Lauro Kurtz Airport
Poços de Caldas – Emb. Walther Moreira Salles Airport
Santo Ângelo – Sepé Tiaraju Airport
Sorriso – Adolino Bedin Regional Airport

Previous Management

By contract
Brasília – Planalto Central Aerodrome (2019–2022)

Top 10
In 2012 those were the top 10 airports according to number of transported passengers, metric tonnes of cargo handled (excluding mail), and number of aircraft operations (domestic and international combined):

Number of transported passengers
1 – São Paulo/Guarulhos – Governador André Franco Montoro International Airport - 32,177,594
2 – Rio de Janeiro – Galeão/Antonio Carlos Jobim International Airport - 17,491,744
3 – São Paulo – Congonhas Airport - 16,775,785
4 – Brasília – Presidente Juscelino Kubitschek International Airport - 15,665,045
5 – Belo Horizonte – Tancredo Neves International Airport - 10,200,348
6 – Rio de Janeiro – Santos Dumont Airport - 8,960,345
7 – Campinas – Viracopos International Airport - 8,824,074
8 – Salvador – Deputado Luís Eduardo Magalhães International Airport- 8,520,837
9 – Porto Alegre – Salgado Filho International Airport - 7,606,507
10 – Curitiba – Afonso Pena International Airport - 6,825,666

Metric tonnes of cargo handled (excluding mail)
1 – São Paulo/Guarulhos – Governador André Franco Montoro International Airport - 448,274
2 – Campinas – Viracopos International Airport - 246,219
3 – Manaus – Eduardo Gomes International Airport - 156,043
4 – Rio de Janeiro – Galeão/Antonio Carlos Jobim International Airport- 118,752
5 – Brasília – Presidente Juscelino Kubitschek International Airport - 60,656
6 – Curitiba – Afonso Pena International Airport - 44,441
7 – Fortaleza – Pinto Martins International Airport - 44,298
8 – Recife – Guararapes/Gilberto Freyre International Airport - 30,741
9 – Belém – Val de Cans/Júlio Cezar Ribeiro International Airport - 30,594
10 – Salvador – Deputado Luís Eduardo Magalhães International Airport- 27,900

Number of aircraft operations
1 – São Paulo/Guarulhos – Governador André Franco Montoro International Airport - 273,882
2 – São Paulo – Congonhas Airport - 213,164
3 – Brasília – Presidente Juscelino Kubitschek International Airport - 194,686
4 – Rio de Janeiro – Galeão/Antonio Carlos Jobim International Airport - 154,318
5 – São Paulo – Campo de Marte Airport - 143,540
6 – Rio de Janeiro – Santos Dumont Airport - 135,373
7 – Salvador – Deputado Luís Eduardo Magalhães International Airport - 121,596
8 – Belo Horizonte – Tancredo Neves International Airport - 120,149
9 – Campinas – Viracopos International Airport - 115,548
10 – Porto Alegre – Salgado Filho International Airport - 96,696

See also

 List of airports in Brazil
List of the busiest airports in Brazil

References

Airport operators
Transport companies established in 1973
Government-owned companies of Brazil
Brazilian companies established in 1973